Thomson Single Member Constituency was a constituency in Singapore. The constituency was formed in 1959 and was abolished in 1991

History 
In 1959, the Thomson Constituency was formed. In 1988, it was renamed as Thomson Single Member Constituency as part of Singapore's political reforms. In 1991, it was abolished and merged into Thomson Group Representation Constituency.

Members of Parliament

Elections

Elections in 1950s

References 

Singaporean electoral divisions